Kader Belarbi (born 1962) is a French ballet dancer, choreographer and director. He spent his whole career in the Paris National Opera Ballet, between 1980 and 2008, and belongs to the company’s “Nureyev generation”, having been made an étoile (principal) by Rudolf Nureyev in 1989.

Since 2012, he has been Director of Dance at the Toulouse Capitol Theatre, heading the Capitol Ballet.

Belarbi’s repertoire as a dancer includes a wide range of classical as well as neoclassical and contemporary works, a number of which he premiered for prominent contemporary choreographers in Paris and as a guest artist in other companies. He himself choreographed around forty works. In the past few years, he has undertaken to revisit the academic repertoire, bringing le Corsaire to France and producing a revised version of Giselle.

In February 2023 he was fired from the Capitol Theatre’s director position for managerial deficiencies.

Choreographies 
 Paris National Opera Ballet
 1991: Giselle et Willy
 1997: Salle des pas perdus
 1998: les Saltimbanques
 2002: Hurlevent
 2008: Formeries

 Grands Ballets canadiens (Montreal)
 2004: les Épousés
 2005: la Bête et la Belle

 National Ballet of China
 2007: Entrelacs

 Grand Théâtre de Genève Ballet
 2007: le Mandarin merveilleux

 Toulouse Capitol Ballet
 2010: Liens de table
 2010: À nos amours
 2011: la Reine morte
 2012: Étranges Voisins
 2013: le Corsaire
 2014: Bach-Suite III
 2015: Giselle
 2016: Mur-Mur

References 
 Dance Review: Hurlevent; Choreography by Kader Belarbi; by Patricia Boccadoro, Culture Kiosque, Paris, 22 April 2002

External links 
 
  Kader Belarbi 
  Toulouse Capitol Theatre 

French male ballet dancers
Paris Opera Ballet étoiles
Chevaliers of the Légion d'honneur
Officers of the Ordre national du Mérite
Officiers of the Ordre des Arts et des Lettres
1962 births
Living people